The 2022 Tipperary Senior Hurling Championship was the 132nd staging of the Tipperary Senior Hurling Championship since its establishment by the Tipperary County Board in 1887.

The defending champions were Loughmore–Castleiney, who were defeated by Drom & Inch at the quarter-final stage.

The competition was overshadowed by the death of Clonoulty–Rossmore hurler Dillon Quirke, who collapsed after 28 minutes of play in a game against Kilruane at Semple Stadium on Friday evening, 5 August 2022. The game was abandoned and other matches were immediately called off.

On 30 October, Kilruane MacDonaghs defeated Kiladangan 2-20 to 1-16 in the final after a replay to win their first title since 1985.

Team changes

To Championship

Promoted from the Séamus Ó Riain Cup
 Templederry Kenyons

From Championship

Relegated to the Tipperary Premier Intermediate Hurling Championship
 Roscrea

Format change
The Séamus Ó Riain Cup was renamed as the Tipperary Premier Intermediate Hurling Championship. This reduced the number of senior hurling clubs in Tipperary from 32 to 16. This meant that unlike in previous years, teams part of the Séamus Ó Riain Cup could no longer compete in their divisional senior championships, where if they were to win, they would enter the knockout stages in a preliminary quarter-final. Only the 16 teams in the group stages of the Tipperary Senior Hurling Championship were able to win the title.

Divisional championship finals

Group stage

Group 1

Results

Group 2

Results

Group 3

Results

Group 4

Results

Relegation

Semi-finals

Final

Knockout stage

Bracket

Preliminary Quarter-Finals

Quarter-finals

Semi-finals

Final

Championship statistics

Top scorers

Overall

In a single game

Miscellaneous
 Kilruane MacDonaghs win their first title since 1985.

References

Tipperary
Tipperary Senior Hurling Championship
Tipperary Senior Hurling Championship